Michael R. Heim is an American author and educator.  Known as "the philosopher of cyberspace", Heim's three scholarly books - Electric Language: A Philosophical Study of Word Processing (Yale University Press, 1986), The Metaphysics of Virtual Reality (Oxford University Press, 1993), and Virtual Realism (Oxford University Press, 1998) - have been translated into Chinese, Japanese, and Korean.  He taught at Missouri Western University in the 1980s, was an online lecturer for Connected Education in the mid-1980s, and taught at the Art Center College of Design in Pasadena, California, 1995–2002. Heim is currently a lecturer at the University of California, Irvine.

External links

References

1944 births
American male non-fiction writers
Living people
Place of birth missing (living people)
Missouri Western State University faculty
University of California, Irvine faculty
Heidegger scholars